Vincent Henderson (born October 20, 1972) is a former American sprinter. He is currently a medical assistant for the Texas A&M University track and field team.

Henderson competed at the University of Arkansas from 1990 to 1994, earning nine All-American honors in the 100, 200 and relays. He won gold medals in the 100 and 4×100 relay during the 1997 Summer Universiade in Italy. Personal Best of 9.95 sec 100 meters, 20.17 sec 200 meters, and 6.57 secs 60 meter dashes. 1993 silver medalist at 100 meters US vs Great Britain. 1994 US Olympic Festival Gold medalist in 100 meters.     Graduated from Texas Chiropractic College Pasadena Tx in 2004.  Team Chiropractor for Texas A&M track and field since 2006 earning 8 national track and field titles while working for the Aggies.

References

External links

Biography at Texas A&M University

1972 births
Living people
University of Arkansas alumni
American male sprinters
Arkansas Razorbacks men's track and field athletes
Athletes (track and field) at the 1995 Pan American Games
Universiade medalists in athletics (track and field)
Texas A&M Aggies track and field coaches
Universiade gold medalists for the United States
Medalists at the 1997 Summer Universiade
Pan American Games track and field athletes for the United States